Roundtop is a hill in northwestern York County, Pennsylvania, with a summit elevation of .  The resort Ski Roundtop is there.

Geology
The mountain is underlain by the York Haven Diabase.

References

Landforms of York County, Pennsylvania
Hills of Pennsylvania